Caledonia Springs is now an unincorporated community in the northwest of the municipality of The Nation, Prescott and Russell United Counties in eastern Ontario, Canada. It is part of the National Capital Region and is in the geographic county of Caledonia.

County Road 20 forms a 90 degree angle heading north and east from the settlement. The nearest named communities are Alfred in the township of Alfred Plantagenet to the north west, and Vankleek Hill to the east. A tributary of the Ruisseau des Atocas flows through the community.

Caledonia Springs was once the site of a large mineral springs spa and hotel. Opening in the 1830s, it slowly grew from a simple structure to a very large luxury health spa and resort before closing in 1915. The hotel and grounds carried a number of different names becoming the Grand Hotel between 1875 and 1905, when the property was purchased by the Canadian Pacific Railway (CPR) who renamed it the Caledonia Springs Hotel. The hotel spa complex and the supporting village, also largely owned by the CPR, boasted a variety of hotels, inns, boarding houses, churches, schools and commercial establishments and at its peak had a population of perhaps 500 to 1000 persons. Though its customers came primarily from Montreal and Ottawa, people from as far away as New York and Europe came to enjoy the country and take the natural spring waters. The various owners of the hotel and spring over its long history also shipped large amounts of its mineral water across Canada, to the US and to Europe. The Caledonia Springs Hotel was closed by the CPR in 1915. The last hotel in the town, the Adanac Inn, closed in 1947 and the railway tracks and station, constructed in 1896, closed and were removed by 1986. Nothing is left now but a bike trail, known as the Prescott and Russell Recreational Trail, which follows the old railway right of way.

References

External links
 The Lost Glory of Caledonia Springs (archive version)
 Virtual Reference Library original books about Caledonia Springs
 South nations conservation

Communities in the United Counties of Prescott and Russell
Ruins in Canada